The Isanzu (Anyihanzu) are a Bantu ethno-linguistic group based in Mkalama, Singida, Tanzania.  In 1987 the Isanzu population was estimated to number 32,400 . The Isanzu have matrilineal descent groups and are agriculturalists who subsist on sorghum, millet, and maize. Most Isanzu make a living as farmers and through migrant labour to other parts of the country, principally, Arusha.

Isanzuland was colonized by Germany in the late 19th century, and during the First World War, occupied by British forces. Following the war Tanganyika became a British Trust Territory and a British administration governed this area, like the rest of the Territory, through a policy of Indirect Rule until independence in 1961.

Language 
The Isanzu speak a Bantu language called kinyihanzu. Nearly everyone also speaks Swahili, Tanzania's lingua franca. Because of interaction with Iraq Nyaturu, and Nyiramba people also speak Iraq, Nyaturu, and Nyiramba.

Big Clans and Families 

 Kitunga
 Msindai
 Mpeku
 Manzawa
 Mpinga
 Mahumi
 Malalika
 Gang'ai
 Mpanda
 Mkilanya
 Mzengi
 Holela 
 Mikael 
 Mtiko
 Ibobo
 Saenda
 Giisi (Yagisi)
 Pyuza (Taken from Nyiramba)

Notes

References 

Adam, Virginia 1963. Rainmaking rites in Ihanzu. Conference proceedings from the Makarere Institute of Social Research. Adam is a social anthropologist who worked with the Isanzu in 1961 and 1962.

  The book is a collection of Hadza myths about giants, also some myths about culture heroes, and anecdotical tales.  Kohl-Larsen was an adventurer, amateur ethnographer and archaeologist. He travelled through (then) Tanganyika in the 1930s, and very much hoped that the former German colony would soon be returned, which never happened. His ethnographic accounts are deeply coloured by Nazi Germany's political ambitions and are not a reliable source of information.

Sanders, Todd 2008. Beyond Bodies: Rainmaking and Sense Making in Tanzania. Toronto: University of Toronto Press. Sanders is a social anthropologist who worked in Isanzu in the 1990s.

 
Indigenous peoples of East Africa